Andrei Pavlenko may refer to:

 Andrei Pavlenko (footballer) (born 1986), Russian footballer
 Andrei Pavlenko (ice hockey) (born 2000), Belarusian ice hockey player